The Wisconsin Elections Commission is a bipartisan regulatory agency of the State of Wisconsin established to administer and enforce election laws in the state.  The Wisconsin Elections Commission was established by a 2015 act of the Wisconsin Legislature which also established the Wisconsin Ethics Commission to administer campaign finance, ethics, and lobbying laws.  The two commissions began operation on June 30, 2016, replacing the Wisconsin Government Accountability Board (GAB), which was abolished.

The Government Accountability Board had been established in 2008 to replace the Wisconsin Elections Board and Wisconsin Ethics Board.

Membership
The Commission is made up of six members, two of which are appointed by the Governor, and one each by the President of the Senate, the Senate Minority Leader, the Speaker of the Assembly, and the Assembly Minority Leader. As of 2020, Republicans and Democrats have three members each.

The staff of the Commission are non-partisan, and are led by an administrator appointed by the commission and confirmed by the Wisconsin Senate. Meagan Wolfe was appointed interim administrator March 2, 2018, and was unanimously confirmed by the Wisconsin State Senate on May 15, 2019 for a term ending June 30, 2023.

Current Commissioners

History

Establishment (2015)
The law to create the Wisconsin Elections Commission and the Wisconsin Ethics Commission, 2015 Wisconsin Act 118, was signed into law on December 16, 2015, by Governor Scott Walker.  The two commissions formally came into existence on June 30, 2016.

Presidential election recount (2016)

On November 25, 2016, the Commission received a petition from Green Party presidential nominee Jill Stein for a hand recount of the votes in the state from the 2016 presidential election. On November 28, the Commission rejected Stein's request for a hand recount.

Attempted voter purge (2019–2020)

In 2019, the Wisconsin Institute for Law and Liberty (WILL) petitioned Paul V. Malloy, the presiding circuit court judge in Ozaukee County, Wisconsin, to remove 234,000 voters from the statewide rolls. WILL's lawsuit demanded that the Commission respond to a "Movers Report," which was produced via computer analysis of voter data compiled by the Electronic Registration Information Center (ERIC). Funded in 2012 by the Pew Charitable Trusts, ERIC is a non-partisan national non-profit organization that shares voter registration information aimed at improving the accuracy and reliability of voter rolls and increasing voter participation.

Malloy ruled that Wisconsin law compelled him to order an urgent purging of those possibly invalid registrants from the voter rolls, and refused to grant standing to the League of Women Voters (LWV) and the Wisconsin Democracy Campaign (WDC) to intervene in the case. The WDC filed suit in federal court to halt the contested purging. Acting on behalf of the Commission, which was split 3-3 on the matter Josh Kaul, Wisconsin's Attorney General, joined the appeal to stay Malloy's removals.

The ERIC report had tagged 234,039 registrations, around 7% of all registrants in Wisconsin, after its analysis concluded they might have moved to an address which had not yet been updated on their voter registration records, or were otherwise suspected to be invalid. Notifications were sent to all those voters that their registration might need to be brought up to date. Some sixty thousand of those notices were found to be undeliverable. Approximately 2,300 voters confirmed that their registrations were correct. An additional 16,500 had reregistered at more recent addresses. The registrations of those determined to be deceased would be removed. The Commission estimated that the voter verification process would take one to two years to complete prior to initiating any action to remove those former voters, the accuracy of whose registrations still remained unresolved. Despite insufficient evidence for removal of that extraordinary number of qualified voters, the state could be forced to comply with Malloy's order. On January 2, 2020, WILL said it asked the circuit court to hold the Elections Commission in contempt, fining it up to $12,000 daily, until it advanced Malloy's December 17, 2019 order to remove from the rolls registrations of hundreds of thousands of voters who might have moved to a different address. The case was being heard in a state appeals court, but it was presumed that the conservative-dominated Wisconsin Supreme Court could be expected to support Malloy's ruling. The purge was construed to be targeting voters living in the cities of Madison, and Milwaukee, as well as college towns, which all tended to favor Democrats. Reporter and author Greg Palast associated the Wisconsin effort at voter purging as conforming to a national Republican party strategy which had attracted international attention. On January 12, 2020, Malloy found the three Democrats on the stalemated six-member Elections Commission to be in contempt of court, ordering them each to pay a fine of $250 daily until they complied with his order. Malloy demanded urgent implementation of his order, saying, "We're deadlocked, time is running and time is clearly of the essence." The Milwaukee Journal Sentinel examined the list of voters subject to being purged because they were presumed to have moved, and found that about 55 percent of those registrants had been domiciled in municipalities that had been won by Hillary Clinton in the 2016 general election.

References

External links
Official website

Government of Wisconsin
Politics of Wisconsin